What Do You Want From Me is the debut solo album by Orfeh, released on September 30, 2008 (see 2008 in music)

Track listing 

 "What Do You Want From Me" (Orfeh, Andrew Logan, Pam Reswick) – 4:21
 "Look At Me Now" (Andrew Logan, Pam Reswick) – 4:05
 "Last Time I Cry" (Andrew Logan, Mike More) – 4:01
 "Love Me Today" (Andrew Logan, Orfeh, Gary Wright) – 2:38
 "Dirt" (Andrew Logan, Pam Reswick) – 3:24
 "Tell That To My Heart" (Duet with Andrew Logan) (Andrew Logan, Pam Reswick) – 3:42
 "Falling in Love" (Toby Gad, Orfeh) - 3:30
 "Sing You To Sleep" (Andrew Logan, Mike More) – 3:52
 "Don't Wanna Do Wrong" (Andrew Logan, Mike More) – 3:52
 "Fall" (Andrew Logan, Pam Reswick) – 4:31
 "Just Don't Talk About Love" (Andrew Logan, Pam Reswick) – 3:38
 "Up Tempo Pop Song" (Andrew Logan, Pam Reswick, Orfeh) – 3:05

References 

2008 albums